The Canton of Nontron is a former canton of the Dordogne département, in France. It was disbanded following the French canton reorganisation which came into effect in March 2015. It consisted of 8 communes, which joined the canton of Périgord Vert Nontronnais in 2015. It had 8,810 inhabitants (2012).

The lowest point is 115 m in the commune of Javerlhac-et-la-Chapelle-Saint-Robert, the highest point is in Abjat-sur-Bandiat at 355 m, the average elevation is 197 m. The most populated commune was Nontron with 3,212 inhabitants (2012).

Communes
The canton comprised the following communes:

Abjat-sur-Bandiat
Augignac
Le Bourdeix
Connezac
Hautefaye
Javerlhac-et-la-Chapelle-Saint-Robert
Lussas-et-Nontronneau
Nontron
Saint-Estèphe
Saint-Front-sur-Nizonne
Saint-Martial-de-Valette
Saint-Martin-le-Pin
Savignac-de-Nontron
Sceau-Saint-Angel
Teyjat

Population history

See also 
 Arrondissements of the Dordogne department
 Cantons of the Dordogne department
 Communes of the Dordogne department

References

Nontron
2015 disestablishments in France
States and territories disestablished in 2015